Ushasie Chakraborty is an Indian actress and academic who works in Bengali language films. She has played the role of Satyabati in Anjan Dutt's film adaptations on Byomkesh Bakshi. She currently plays the role of June Guha in the Bengali television show Sreemoyee.

Career 
Chakraborty has played the role of Satyabati in every film of Anjan Dutt's film adaptation of Byomkesh Bakshi. She has also worked in other films, including Ranjana Ami Ar Ashbona, Bedroom, Shah Jahan Regency, Mukhomukhi, and Kusumitar Golpo. Her role as June in Sreemoyee has been described by The Times of India as "hugely popular among the audience," which also notes that "social media is filled with memes on 'June Auntie' and her 'Mashi'."

Education

In 2020, Chakraborty submitted her PhD thesis in the midst of personal challenges, including the death of her father. At Jadavpur University, she wrote about bias against female drivers for her MPhil.

Community service

During the COVID-19 lockdown, Chakraborty helped organize and participated in a regular community kitchen for stranded migrant workers.

Personal life
Chakraborty is the daughter of veteran Communist Party of India (Marxist) leader Shyamal Chakraborty, who died in August 2020 after contracting COVID-19.

In 2011, she campaigned for the CPI(M) before the 2011 West Bengal Legislative Assembly election. In a June 2011 interview, she said she felt her father's political identity is a disadvantage for her in the film industry.

Filmography
 Kaler Rakhal (2009)
 Byomkesh Bakshi (2010)
 Ranjana Ami Ar Ashbona (2011)
 Abar Byomkesh (2011)
 Bedroom (2012)
 Jibon Rang Berang (2012)
 Abaar Byomkesh Bakshi-Chitrachor (2012)
 Kangal Malsat (2013)
 Mrs. Sen (2013)
 Teen patti (2014)
 Byomkesh Phire Elo (2014)
 Byomkesh Bakshi (2015)
 Byomkesh O Agniban (2017)
 Shah Jahan Regency (2018)
 Mukhomukhi (2018)
 Kusumitar Gappo (2019)

Television
 Parikshya (Door Darshan Bangla, 2000)
 Ekhane Aakash Neel (Star Jalsha 2008-2009) 
 Sreemoyee (Star Jalsha 2019–2021)

Web series
 Virgin Mohito (2018)

Awards

References

External links
 

Living people
Bengali actresses
Actresses from Kolkata
Indian film actresses
Year of birth missing (living people)
Actresses in Bengali cinema
Indian actor-politicians
21st-century Indian women politicians
21st-century Indian politicians
21st-century Indian actresses
Women in West Bengal politics